The El Campo Tourist Courts is a historic motel on Central Avenue (former U.S. Route 66) in Albuquerque, New Mexico, which is notable as one of the best-preserved prewar Route 66 motels remaining in the city. The motel was later converted into an apartment complex. The property was added to the New Mexico State Register of Cultural Properties in 1993 and the National Register of Historic Places in 1994.

The motel consists of two one-story buildings, one rectangular and one L-shaped, with a total of 11 rooms. Both buildings step down towards the rear of the property due to sloping terrain. The rectangular building has an office and store space at the front which is oriented at 45 degrees to the rest of the building, facing the entrance. A two-story addition was built on the front of the L-shaped building in the 1990s. The motel's architecture is southwestern vernacular, with Pueblo Revival and Spanish Colonial Revival elements.

References

Hotels in Albuquerque, New Mexico
Hotel buildings on the National Register of Historic Places in New Mexico
New Mexico State Register of Cultural Properties
National Register of Historic Places in Albuquerque, New Mexico
Hotel buildings completed in 1939
Motels in the United States
U.S. Route 66 in New Mexico